Mortimer Fitzland Elliott (September 24, 1839 – August 5, 1920) was a Democratic member of the U.S. House of Representatives from Pennsylvania.

Biography
Mortimer F. Elliott was born in Cherry Flats, near Wellsboro, Pennsylvania.  He attended the common schools, Wellsboro Academy, and Alfred University.  He studied law, was admitted to the bar in 1860 and commenced practice in Wellsboro.  He was a member of the convention to revise the constitution of Pennsylvania in 1873.

Elliott was elected as a Democrat to the Forty-eighth Congress.  He was an unsuccessful candidate for reelection in 1884.  He resumed the practice of law, and served as general solicitor for the Standard Oil Company in New York City.  He died in Mansfield, Pennsylvania, 1920.  Interment in Wellsboro Cemetery in Wellsboro.

Sources

The Political Graveyard

1839 births
1920 deaths
Alfred University alumni
Pennsylvania lawyers
Democratic Party members of the United States House of Representatives from Pennsylvania
19th-century American lawyers